Altuğ is a Turkish masculine given name and a Turkish surname.

Given name 
 Altuğ Taner Akçam (born 1953), Turkish-German historian, sociologist and author

Surname 
 Emre Altuğ (born 1970), Turkish pop singer and actor
 İrem Altuğ (born 1980), Turkish actress and author
 Ömer Altuğ (musician) (1907–1965), Turkish musician
 Ömer Altuğ (ambassador) (born 1947), Turkish ambassador
 Şevket Altuğ (born 1943), Turkish actor

References 

Turkish masculine given names
Turkish-language surnames